Mokhovsky is a rural locality (a khutor) in Mikhaylovka Urban Okrug, Volgograd Oblast, Russia. The population was 528 as of 2010. There are 17 streets.

Geography 
Mokhovsky is located 23 km northeast of Mikhaylovka. Maly Oreshkin is the nearest rural locality.

References 

Rural localities in Mikhaylovka urban okrug